Eric Wesley (born 1973) is an American artist. Wesley was born in Los Angeles, California, where he continues to live and work. He has held solo exhibitions in galleries internationally as well as at the Museum of Contemporary Art, Los Angeles and Foundation Morra Greco, Naples, Italy.

Wesley has participated in group shows at the Hammer Museum in Los Angeles; Musée d’Art Contemporain, Bordeaux, France; Fundación/Colección, Jumex, Mexico; Museo d’Arte, Benevento, Italy; The Prague Biennial in 2007; Institute of Contemporary Arts, London; P.S.1, New York; The Whitney, New York; and the Studio Museum in Harlem.

Eric Wesley is also the co-founder of Mountain School of Art (MSA), Los Angeles, CA.

Education
Wesley has a B.A. from the University of California, Los Angeles

Solo exhibitions

2012
 2 new works, Bortolami, NY
2011 
 The Same ‘Ol New Frontier, China Art Objects, Los Angeles
2010
 D’Carts Blanche and New Paintings, Bortolami Gallery, New York
2009
 New Realistic Figures, Maureen Paley, London
2008
 Ship Shape Shit Shelf and the Empfang Box, Feurig59, Berlin
2007
 Spaference Room, Bortolami Gallery, New York
 Spafice, Foundation Morra Greco, Naples, Italy
2006
 Audi, Meyer-Riegger Gallery, Karlsruhe, Germany
 You say Tomato, I say Tomato, Galleria Fonti, Naples, Italy
 Eric Wesley, China Art Objects Galleries, Los Angeles
 MOCA FOCUS: Eric Wesley, Museum of Contemporary Art, Los Angeles
2005
 Bowie-Van Valen Gallery, Amsterdam, Netherlands
2004
 Pico Youth Center, China Art Objects Galleries, Los Angeles
 I love WW2, Locust Projects, Miami, FL
2003
 Jeans Theory, Statements, Art Basel, Basel, Switzerland
2002
 Metro Pictures, New York
 Enchilada “The Endless Burrito”, Meyer-Reigger Galerie, Karlsruhe, Germany
 Ouchi, Galeria Franco Noero, Torino, Italy
2001
 Two Story Clocktower, Caltech, Pasadena, CA
2000
 Kicking Ass, China Art Objects Galleries, Los Angeles
1999
 Camper, China Art Objects Galleries, Los Angeles

Group exhibitions

2011
 Making Histories – Changing Views of the Collection, Temporary Stedelijk Museum 3, Amsterdam
 Greater LA, 483 Broadway, SoHo, New York
 BigMinis: Fetishes of Crisis, Musée d'Art Contemporain, Bordeaux, France
2010
 The Artist's Museum, MOCA Geffen Contemporary, Los Angeles, CA
 RE-DRESSING, Bortolami Gallery, New York, NY
 The Inauguration of China Art Objects in Culver City, Los Angeles
 Les enfants terribles, Fundacion Coleccion Jumex, Mexico
 Video Journeys, Cottage Home, Los Angeles
2009 
 Second Nature: Dean Valentine Collection, Hammer Museum, Los Angeles
 1999, China Art Objects, Los Angeles
2008
 The Light of the Virgo, China Art Objects, Los Angeles
 Los Angeles Confidential, Centre d'Art du Parc Saint Léger, Pougues-les-Eaux, France
 Amateurs, CCA Wattis Institute for Contemporary Arts, San Francisco
 ITALIA ITALIE ITALIEN ITALY WLOCHY, ARCOS Museo d’Arte,Benevento,Italy
 Globetrotters, 410 Cottage Home, Los Angeles, Curated by Katie Brennan
 Sand- Meaning and Metaphor, Parrish Museum, New York, NY
2007
 Prague Biennial, Prague, Czech Republic
 Milieu, Lizabeth Oliveria, Los Angeles
 Angles Gallery, Los Angeles
 One Foot High and Rising, Balmoral Gallery, Venice, CA
 Darling, Take Fountain, Kalfayan Gallery, Greece
 Substance & Surface, Bortolami, New York
2006
 Axis of Praxis, Midway Contemporary Art, Minneapolis, MN
 Design-O-mite, Black Dragon Society, Los Angeles
 Alien Nation, Institute of Contemporary Art, London, England
 The Gold Standard, P.S. 1 Contemporary Art Center, Long Island City, NY
 Survivor, Bortolami Dayan, New York
2005
 Closing Down: Thanks, Bortolami Dayan, New York
 A Walk to Remember, Organized by Jens Hoffmann, Los Angeles Contemporary Exhibitions, Los Angeles, CA
 100 Artists See God, Curated by John Baldessari and Meg Cranston, Organized by ICA, London, England
 Installations, I-20 Gallery, New York, NY
 Having Differences. I-20 Gallery, New York, NY
2004
 Whitney Biennial, Whitney Museum of American Art, New York
 3 Fireplaces and 2 Bathtubs, Museum für Angewandte Kunst (MAK), Vienna, Austria
2003
 Fade (1990–2003), Curated by Malik Gaines, Craft and Folk Art Museum at the Luckman Gallery, Los Angeles, CA
 Works for Giovanni, China Art Objects Galleries, Los Angeles, CA
 More Boots = Many Routes, Eric Wesley, Lee O’Connor, Ryan Doolan, Transmission Gallery, Glasgow, Scotland
 New Space! New Show!, Galeria Franco Noero, Turin, Italy
 Adios Pendejos, OPA: Oficina Para Proyectos de Arte, Guadelajara, Mexico
 Eduardo Sarabia and Eric Wesley, Sutton Lane, London
 Adios Pendejos, OPA: Oficina Para Proyectos de Arte, Guadelajara, Mexico
2002
 Drive By: Nine Artists from Los Angeles, Reynolds Gallery, Virginia
2001
 Freestyle, Studio Museum, Harlem, New York, Santa Monica Museum of Art
 Snapshot: New Art From Los Angeles, UCLA Hammer Museum, Los Angeles
 Museum of Contemporary Art, Miami, Florida
 Purloined, Artists Space, New York, September 6 - October 13
 Circles 3: Silver Lake Crossings, Zentrum Fur Kunst und Mediatechnologie, Karlsruhe, Germany. Curated by Christoph Keller.
 Drive: Power, Progress, Desire, Govett Brewster Art Gallery, New Plymouth, New Zealand. Curated by Gregory Burke.
 Group Show, Metro Pictures, New York
2000
 Young and Dumb, ACME, Los Angeles, Curated by Pentti Monkkonen.
1999
 L.A. Edge Festival, Los Angeles, organized by Simon Watson.
1998
 I-Candy, Rosamund Felsen Gallery, Santa Monica
 Brent Petersen Gallery, Los Angeles.

Selected bibliography

 Vitamin 3-D: New Perspectives in Sculpture, Phaidon (2009)
 Schimmel, Paul, “Future Greats,” Art Review, March 2008 p. 87. (2008)
 Burton, Johanna, “Eric Wesley,” ArtForum, March 2008 p. 362. (2008)
 Bovino, Emily Verla, “Eric Wesley,” Frieze online, Oct. 27. (2007)
 Campagnola, Sonia, “Eric Wesley: Let’s Do A Trade,” Flash Art, No. 253, March. (2007)
 Knight, Christopher, “Living Friskily Is Best Revenge,” Los Angeles Times, Aug. 3. (2007)
 Robinson, Walter, “HAMMER Museum Gets Dean Valentine Art,” Artnet.com. (2007)
 Haithman, Diane, “$1 Million New Year's Gift to the Hammer,” Los Angeles Times, Jan.5. (2007)
 Sholis, Brian, “Show Business,” artforum.com. (2007)
 Rochette, Anne and Wade Saunders, “Place Matters: Los Angeles,” Art in America, November. (2006)
 Knight, Christopher, “After a Bold Takeover a Weak Message Is Sent,” Los Angeles Times, April 21. (2006)
 Butler, Cornelia, “Thesis Show,” MOCA Focus: Eric Wesley Catalogue, March. (2006)
 Rogers, Mike, “Eric Wesley,” ArtUS. (2006)
 Romeo, Fillippo, “Critic’s Pick: Eric Wesley,” artforum.com. (2006)
 Gair Boase, Ben Davis, Melissa Dunn, Morgan Falconer, Melissa Gronlund, Ana Finel Honigman, Jane Neal, Bill (2005)
 Roberts, Lauren Stakis, “Future Greats 2005”, ArtReview, December. (2005)
 Stark, Frances, “On the Ground: Los Angeles,” ArtForum. (2005)
 Wang, Michael, “Pop Shop,” artforum.com. (2005)
 Harvey, Doug, “State of the Art ’05,” LA Weekly. (2005)
 Kim, Christine Y., “Color Blind,” V Magazine, #22 April. (2003)
 Ammiratti, Dominick, “Critic’s Pick: Eric Wesley,” artforum.com. (2003)
 Myers, Julian, “Just for Kicks,” Frieze, Issue 72, December. (2002)
 Von Schlegell, Mark, “Review: Snapshot: New Art from Los Angeles,” Artext No. 75, November 2001 – January 2002. (2002)
 Gaines, Malik, “Eric Wesley to the Bone,” Artext No. 75, November. (2001)
 Tumlir, Jan, "Snapshot - LA Exhibit of Work of 25 Artists,” ArtForum, October. (2001)
 Knight, Christopher, “Cultural Evolution in Freestyle”, Los Angeles Times, October 2. (2001)
 Schjeldahl, Peter, “Breaking Away; A Flowering of Young African American Artists,” The New Yorker, June 11. (2001)
 Knight, Christopher, “A Snapshot of L.A. Artists,” Los Angeles Times, June 6. (2001)
 Saltz, Jerry, “Post-Black; Radical Intelligence at the Studio Museum in Harlem”, Village Voice, May 22. (2001)
 Plagens, Peter, “Harlem Goes 'Freestyle',” NEWSWEEK, May. (2001)
 Cotter, Holland, “A Full Studio Museum Show Starts With 28 Artists and a Shoehorn,” New York Times, May 11. (2001)
 Dailey, Meghan, “Preview: Freestyle,” artforum.com. (2001)
 Intra, Giovanni, “Too Autopoeitic to Drive,” Drive catalogue, Govett Brewster Art Gallery, New Zealand. (2000)

References

External links
 Interview with Flash Art
 New York Times Article
 Mousse Magazine
 Eric Wesley at Bortolami Gallery

1973 births
Living people
Artists from Los Angeles
African-American artists
21st-century African-American people
20th-century African-American people